Eşref is the Turkish spelling of the Arabic masculine given name Ashraf (Arabic: أَشْراف ashrāf), meaning "most noble or honorable". 

It may refer to:
Eshrefids, Anatolian beylik (medieval Turkish principality or emirate)
Eşref (magazine), Ottoman magazine

People
Eşref Apak (born 1982), Turkish hammer thrower
Eşref Armağan (born 1953), Turkish painter
Eşref Bitlis (1933–1993), Turkish army general
Eşref Vaiz, Cypriot politician

Turkish masculine given names